AukhsЧеченский Аух и западный Прикаспий в источниках и документах (I – сер. XX в.). © М.С.-Э. Баширов, З.А. Тесаев - ethnographic (subroettic) group of Chechens. Aukhs  are currently living in the territories of Novolaksky (former Aukh District), Khasavyurtovsky, Babayurtovsky and Kazbekovsky (Western part of the Aukh) areas of modern central Dagestan, along the rivers Yamansu, Yaryksu, Aktash and Aksai (earlier Eastern Chechnya).

Modernity (XXI century) 
Nowadays, the Aukh District has not yet been restored. The leadership of the Republic of Dagestan conducts some actions to solve the problem of Aukhs, the effectiveness of which is evaluated in different ways. For example, today there is a gradual resettlement of Laks from the Novolaksky district closer to Makhachkala in Novostroy and the return of Aukhs to their former villages. On October 18, 2000, by the Decree of the State Council of the Republic of Dagestan No. 191, the Chechens-Aukhs were attributed to the indigenous peoples of the Republic of Dagestan.

Clans (teips) 
Aukhovsky Society includes the following clans (teips):
 Akkoy,
 Barchkhoy, 
 Biytaroy,
 Biltoy, 
 Bonoy,
 Vappiy,
 Guloy, 
 Djey, 
 Zandakoy, 
 Zogoy, 
 Kevoy, 
 Karkhoy, 
 Kostoy,
 Merjoy,
 Nokkhoy, 
 Ovrshoy,
 Peshkhoy,
 Pkharchkhoy, 
 Saloy,
 Cechoy,
 Contaroy,
 Chontoy,
 Chungaroy,
 Chantiy,
 Chkharoy, 
 Shinroy.

Citations   

Chechen people